The Bolshevik Military and Battle Organizations consisted of illegal armed formations ("revolutionaries") of Bolsheviks (RSDLP(b)) in the Russian Empire. They played a leading role among combat detachments of "working class" and revolutionary instigation in the Russian Armed Forces, with the goal of creation and fortification of the "Revolution Armed Forces". Local committees of the Bolshevik Military Organization was also informally known as "Voyenka".

The first military and battle organizations were created by Bolsheviks during the 1905 Russian revolution in bigger cities of the Russian Empire: Saint Petersburg, Moscow, Ivanovo-Voznesensk, Kronshtadt, Sevastopol, Saratov, Krasnoyarsk, Nizhniy Novgorod, Tomsk, Warsaw, Vladivostok, Riga and others. The statement of the 3rd Congress of the Russian Social Democratic Labour Party (25 April – 10 May, 1905), "About the armed uprising",  had a significant meaning in the creation of military organization. 

Officially, the Bolshevik Military Organizations were considered to be liquidated on decision of the 7th Congress of the Russian Communist Party (Bolsheviks) in March of 1918.

See also
 Red Guards (Russia)
 SR Combat Organization
 Combat Organization of the Polish Socialist Party
 Military Revolutionary Committee
 Political Directorate of the Soviet Army and Soviet Navy

References

External links
 Military Organization of the Bolshevik Party. Encyclopedia of Marxism (www.marxists.org)
 Military and Combat Organizations of the Bolsheviks. encyclopedia2.thefreedictionary.com (the Great Soviet Encyclopedia translated version)
 The 3rd Congress of the Russian SDLP. About the armed uprising (III СЪЕЗД РСДРП. О вооруженном восстании). www.agitclub.ru.
 V. I. Lenin, I.V. Stalin and L.M. Kaganovich at the All-Russian Conference of the Bolshevik Military Organizations of the Front and Rear (Forces), June 1917. digital.library.pitt.edu (photo)
 Alexander Rabinowitch. How the Bolsheviks Won. www.jacobinmag.com
 A Bolshevik appeal finds an echo in the streets. socialistworker.org. June 22, 2017
 Vasiliy Vasilyev. And our spirit is young (И дух наш молод). "Voyenizdat" (Military publishing). Moscow 1981. (Memoirs, in Russian)

1905 establishments in the Russian Empire
1918 disestablishments in Russia
Organizations established in 1905
Organizations disestablished in 1918
Bolshevik uprisings
Military wings of communist parties
Communist Party of the Soviet Union
Russian Social Democratic Labour Party
Organizations of the 1905 Russian Revolution
Defunct communist militant groups